Green Valley Raceway was a motorsports race track located in Smithfield, Texas, and was part of the Dallas–Fort Worth metroplex. Designed and built by Bill McClure on his North Texas dairy farm, the facility opened in 1960, and was used for over 20 years until its closure in 1986.

Track description and history
Green Valley Raceway was a  permanent road course, whilst the start-finish straight was also used as a drag strip. The road course was used for Trans-Am Series races, SCCA races, and it also held a Can-Am race in 1984. The drag strip was used for NHRA and AHRA-sanctioned events. In 1974, Evel Knievel used the circuit for one of his stunt performances. The track has since been demolished, and is now a site for housing developments. Green Valley Elementary School is also located where the track once was and the school uses a perfect attendance trophy made from a piece of the demolished race track.

Lap records
The fastest official race lap records at Green Valley Raceway are listed as:

References

External links

Defunct sports venues in Texas
Motorsport venues in Texas
Defunct motorsport venues in the United States